The standard 52-card deck of French-suited playing cards is the most common pack of playing cards used today. In English-speaking countries it is the only traditional pack used for playing cards; in many countries of the world, however, it is used alongside other traditional, often older, standard packs with different suit systems such as those with German-, Italian-, Spanish- or Swiss suits. The most common pattern of French-suited cards worldwide and the only one commonly available in Britain and the United States is the English pattern pack. The second most common is the Belgian-Genoese pattern, designed in France, but whose use spread to Spain, Italy, the Ottoman Empire, the Balkans and much of North Africa and the Middle East. In addition to those, there are other major international and regional patterns including standard 52-card packs, for example, in Italy that use Italian-suited cards. In other regions, such as Spain and Switzerland, the traditional standard pack comprises 36, 40 or 48 cards.

Composition 
A standard 52-card French-suited deck comprises 13 ranks in each of the four suits: clubs, diamonds, hearts and spades. Each suit includes three court cards (face cards), King, Queen and Jack, with reversible (double-headed) images. Each suit also includes ten numeral cards or pip cards, from one (Ace) to ten. The card with one pip is known as an Ace. Each pip card displays the number of pips (symbols of the suit) corresponding to its number, as well as the appropriate numeral (except "A" for the Ace) in at least two corners.

In addition, commercial decks often include anywhere from one to six (most often two or three since the mid-20th century) Jokers, often distinguishable with one being more colourful than the other, as some card games require these extra cards. The Jokers can also be used as replacements for lost or damaged cards.

Design 

The most popular standard pattern of the French deck is the English pattern (pictured above), sometimes referred to as the International pattern or Anglo-American pattern. The second most common is the Belgian-Genoese pattern, which was designed in France for export and spread to Spain, Italy, the Ottoman Empire, the Balkans and much of North Africa and the Middle East. There are also numerous others such as the Berlin pattern, Nordic pattern, Dondorf Rhineland pattern (pictured right) and the variants of the European pattern.

Modern playing cards carry index labels on opposite corners or in all four corners to facilitate identifying the cards when they overlap and so that they appear identical for players on opposite sides. For the Ace and court cards, this label is the initial letter or letters of the name of that card. In English-speaking countries they are lettered A, K, Q and J for Ace, King, Queen and Jack. In other countries the letters may vary, although the English versions are also sometimes used. Germany uses A, K, D and B (Ass, König, Dame and Bube); Russia uses the Cyrillic letters Т, К, Д and В (Tuz, Korol, Dama and Valet); Sweden uses E, K, D and Kn (Ess, Kung, Dam and Knekt) and France uses 1, R, D, V (As, Roi, Dame, and Valet).

All early playing cards were single headed (also called single ended). During the 19th century, card manufacturers began designing double-headed cards so that the cards could be readily identified whichever way up they were. In the case of court cards, this entailed cutting off the lower half of the image and replacing it with an inverted copy of the top half usually, but not always, with a horizontal or sloping dividing line between the two halves. Today, while single headed patterns of German-suited and Latin-suited cards still exist, modern French-suited cards are invariably double headed.

Although French-suited, 52-card packs are the most common playing cards used internationally, there are many countries or regions where the traditional pack size is only 36 (Russia, Bavaria) or 32 (north and central Germany, Austria) or where regional cards with smaller packs are preferred for many games. For example, 40- or 48-card Italian-suited packs are common in Italy; 40- and 48-card Spanish-suited packs on the Iberian peninsula; and 36-card German-suited packs are very common in Bavaria and Austria. In addition, tarot cards are required for games such as French Tarot (78 cards), which is widely played in France, and the Tarock family of games (42 or 54 cards) played in countries like Austria and Hungary.

History 
The English pattern pack originated in Britain which was importing French playing cards from Rouen and Antwerp by 1480. The earliest cards of the English pattern date to around 1516. But Britain only started manufacturing its own cards towards the end of the 16th century, when card production began in London. These were based on the Rouen pattern, but unlike the traditional French cards, they dropped the names on the court cards. The English pattern evolved, in the process losing "some of its Rouen flavour and elegance and became more and more stylised. The figures took more space in the cards and many details were distorted."

All early cards of this type were single-headed, but around 1860, the double-headed cards, universally used on modern decks, appeared. Corner indices were added around 1880. During the 19th century, the English pattern spread all over the world and is now used almost everywhere, even in countries where traditional patterns and other suits are popular. In America, the English pattern was copied onto wider cards.

The fanciful design and manufacturer's logo commonly displayed on the ace of spades began under the reign of James I of England, who passed a law requiring an insignia on that card as proof of payment of a tax on local manufacture of cards. Until August 4, 1960, decks of playing cards printed and sold in the United Kingdom were liable for taxable duty and the ace of spades carried an indication of the name of the printer and the fact that taxation had been paid on the cards. The packs were also sealed with a government duty wrapper.

Card size

Historically the size of playing cards was down to the printer, but during the 19th century sizes became standardised, initially to a size of 3½ x 2½ inches. Today these are often referred to as "wide" cards or "poker-sized" cards. Wider playing cards had advantages: it was harder to cheat and, if packs were unavailable, dog-eared cards could be trimmed smaller. Narrower cards, known as "whist-sized" or "bridge-sized" cards, probably first appeared in Europe and enabled players to handle the larger numbers of cards required for games like bridge. 

However, there is no formal requirement for precise adherence and minor variations are produced by various manufacturers in different countries. In Germany, for example, standard Poker and Rummy packs by ASS Altenburger and Ravensburger measure 92 × 59 mm. Austria's Piatnik sells packs marketed for Bridge, Poker and Whist measuring 89 × 58 mm; while Britain's Waddingtons produce generic packs sized at 88 × 58 mm.

Other sizes are also available, such as a medium size (usually ) and a miniature size (typically ). These are often intended for playing patience or solitaire games. Larger 'jumbo' cards are produced for card tricks and those with poor eyesight.

The thickness and weight of modern playing cards are subject to numerous variables related to their purpose of use and associated material design for durability, stiffness, texture and appearance.

Markings 
Some decks include additional design elements. Casino blackjack decks may include markings intended for a machine to check the ranks of cards, or shifts in rank location to allow a manual check via an inlaid mirror. Many casino decks and solitaire decks have four indices instead of just two. Some modern decks have bar code markings on the edge of the face to enable them to be sorted by machine (for playing duplicate bridge, especially simultaneous events where the same hands may be played at many different venues). Some decks have large indices for clarity. These are sometimes sold as 'seniors' cards for older people with limited eyesight, but may also be used in games like stud poker, where being able to read cards from a distance is a benefit and hand sizes are small.

Four-colour packs 

The standard French-suited pack uses black for the spades and clubs, and red for the hearts and diamonds. However, some packs use four colours for the suits in order to make it easier to tell them apart. There are several schemes: a common one is the English Poker format with black spades (♠), red hearts (♥), blue diamonds (♦) and green clubs (♣). Another common system is based on the German suits and uses green spades (♠) and yellow diamonds (♦) with red hearts (♥) and black clubs (♣).

Nomenclature 
When giving the full written name of a specific card, the rank is given first followed by the suit, e.g., "ace of spades" or "Ace of Spades". Shorthand notation may reflect this by listing the rank first, "A♠"; this is common usage when discussing poker; but it is equally common in more general sources to find the suit listed first, as in "♠K" for a single card or "♠AKQ" for multiple cards. This is common practice when writing about bridge as it helps differentiate between the card(s) and the contract (e.g. "4♥", a contract of four hearts). Tens may be either abbreviated to T or written as 10.

Terminology 
Common collective and individual terms for playing cards that are relevant, but not exclusive to, the 52-card pack are:
Face card or court carda jack, queen or king.
Honour card – a card that attracts a special bonus or payment for being held or captured in play. In bridge, honours are the aces, the court cards and tens (A, K, Q, J, 10); in whist and related games, the aces and courts (A, K, Q, J).
Wild card card that may be designated by the owner to represent any other card.
Numerals or pip cards are the cards numbered from 2 to 10.
"1" cards are usually known as aces.
"2" cards are also known as deuces.
"3" cards are also known as treys.

Nicknames 

Certain cards have acquired nicknames over time. The following common nicknames for cards of the English pattern pack only. Other patterns are different and may have other nicknames in the countries where they are used:
One-eyed Jacksthe jack of spades and the jack of hearts are depicted in profile, while the others are shown in full or oblique face.
One-eyed Royalsare the king of diamonds as well as the one-eyed jacks. The rest of the courts are shown in full or oblique face.
Suicide KingsThe king of hearts is typically shown with a sword behind his head, making him appear to be stabbing himself. Similarly, the one-eyed king of diamonds is typically shown with an axe behind his head with the blade facing toward him. These depictions, and their blood-red colour, inspired this nickname.
The king of diamonds is traditionally armed with an axe, while the other three kings are armed with swords; thus, the king of diamonds is sometimes referred to as "the man with the axe". This is the basis of the trump "one-eyed jacks and the man with the axe". Poker may be played with wild cards, often "Aces, Jacks, and the King with the Axe".
The ace of spades, unique in its large, ornate spade, is sometimes said to be the death card or the picture card, and in some games is used as a trump card.
The queen of spades usually holds a sceptre and is sometimes known as "the bedpost queen", though more often she is called the "black lady". She is the only queen facing left.
In many decks, the queen of clubs holds a flower. She is thus known as the "flower queen", though this design element is among the most variable; the Bicycle Poker deck depicts all queens with a flower styled according to their suit.

Computer representations

SVG

Unicode
As of Unicode 7.0, playing cards are now represented. Note that the following chart ("Cards", Range: 1F0A0–1F0FF) includes cards from the Tarot Nouveau deck, as well as the standard 52-card deck.

See also
 500 decks coming with extra ranks
 French playing cards
 German playing cards
 Italian playing cards
 Spanish playing cards
 Stripped decks come with fewer ranks.
 Tarot Nouveau, the most common French-suited tarot game deck

Notes

References

Bibliography 
 Arnold, Peter (1988). The Book of Card Games, 2nd edn. London: Barnes & Noble. 
 Parlett, David (2008), The Penguin Book of Card Games, London: Penguin, 
 Phillips, Hubert (1957), ed. Culbertson's Card Games Complete. Watford: Arco.

Playing cards